Khetag Nikolayevich Tsabolov (Ossetian:Цæболты Николайы фырт Хетæг, ; born 17 November 1991) also known as Khetik Tsabolov is a Russian and Serbian freestyle wrestler of Ossetian ethnicity who competes at 74 kilograms. After competing for Russia throughout his career, Tsabolov transferred to Serbia in February 2021, and has since represented the latter. An accomplished athlete, he won the World Championship and the Russian Nationals in 2014 (70 kg), and claimed a World Championship silver medal after winning Russian Nationals in 2017.

He was also the 2018 Ivan Yarygin Grand Prix champion (medalist in 2012 and 2014), a three-time Russian National runner-up (2018, 2019 and 2020), and a two-time Military World Games champion (2015 and 2019). A three-time Military World Champion, Tsabolov was also a '11 Junior World Champion.

He competed in the 74kg event at the 2022 World Wrestling Championships held in Belgrade, Serbia.

References 

1991 births
Living people
Russian male sport wrestlers
World Wrestling Championships medalists
Sportspeople from Vladikavkaz